The following is a list of female writers in the detective and mystery genres.

A-C

D-G

H-L

M-Q

R-Z

See also 
 Lists of authors
 List of mystery writers
 List of thriller authors
 List of female detective characters
 Detective fiction
 Crime fiction
 Mystery fiction
 Whodunit

List of female detective mystery writers
Detective mystery